Ivan Beneš (born 17 February 1960 in Prague) is a Czech former basketball player and currently coach of the Czech national team, which he coached at the EuroBasket Women 2017.

References

Czech men's basketball players
Czech basketball coaches
Sportspeople from Prague
1960 births
Living people
21st-century Czech people